Pobuđe is a village in the municipality of Bratunac, Bosnia and Herzegovina.

References

Populated places in Bratunac